Lakshmipuram Palace Pooram Thirunal Ravi Varma known as L.P.R. Varma (1926–2003) was a Carnatic musician, lyricist, music director, singer, screen writer, and actor.

Life
Varma was born in Lakshmipuram Palace, the Puzhavathu, Changanassery in Travancore State. He began music at the age of eight and was trained under tMuthaiyah Bhagavathar, Semmangudy Sreenivasa Iyer and Madura Keshava Bhagavathar. 

He  conducted a large number of Carnatic music concerts in south India. He performed and  composed music for many Malayalam films and professional dramas. He belonged to the Parappanangadi royal family (Malabar – part of North Kerala) and they were settled in Changanassery. He generally performed in Malayalam language. In 1978, he received the Kerala Sangeetha Nataka Akademi Award.

He acted in Malayalam movie Ayitham (1988) starring Mohanlal as Vishwanatha Bhagavathar.

He died on 6 July 2003, aged 76.

References

Malayalam-language lyricists
People from Changanassery
Malayali people
1927 births
2003 deaths
Indian conductors (music)
20th-century Indian musicians
Musicians from Kerala
20th-century conductors (music)
Recipients of the Kerala Sangeetha Nataka Akademi Award